Nicholas Bell (born 15 August 1958) is an English actor who has worked in Australia for more than 20 years. He works regularly with the Melbourne Theatre Company as well as with all the major television broadcasters in Australia, most notably the Australian Broadcasting Corporation. In addition to his work in film and television, Bell has also recorded over a dozen audiobooks with Bolinda, a company based in Melbourne, Australia.

In 2001 he accepted on behalf of the cast and crew of the Australian comedy series The Games the TV Week Logie Award for Most Outstanding Comedy Program.

Film and television

Film

 Father (1990) as Paul Jamieson
 Hunting (1991) as Piggot
 Gross Misconduct (1993) as Detective Matthews
 The Feds (1993, TV Movie) as Stephen Garrard
 Paperback Romance (1994) as Sophie's Doctor
 Hotel Sorrento (1995) as Edwin
 Mighty Morphin Power Rangers: The Movie (1995) as Zordon
 Shine (1996) as Ben Rosen
 Dark City (1998) as Mr. Rain
 Dead Letter Office (1998) as Kevin
 The Craic (1999) as Derek Johnson
 The Magicians (2000, TV Movie) as Reverend Thompson
 Mission: Impossible 2 (2000) as McCloy's Accountant
 The Dish (2000) as TV Scientist (uncredited)
 Ned Kelly (2003) as Richard Cook
 Bad Eggs (2003) as Wicks
 Take Away (2003) as Squire
 Am Kap Der Lieb (2004, TV Movie) as Jonathan Percy
 Salem's Lot (2004) as Frank
 Attack of the Sabretooth (2005, TV Movie) as Niles
 The Great Raid (2005) as Duke
 Life (2005, TV Movie) as William Burton
 Opal Dream (2005) as Judge McNulty
 The Caterpillar Wish (2006) as Father Caleb
 Charlotte's Web (2006) as Minister Becker
 Noise (2007) as Noel Birchall
 Prey (2009) as Rifleman
 I Love You Too (2010) as Alice's Dad
 Don't Be Afraid of the Dark (2010) as Psychiatrist
 Taj (2011, filming in 2010) as Tony
 Kath & Kimderella (2012) as Priest
 Crawlspace (2012) as Caesar
 Dangerous Remedy (2012 telemove) as Dr. Troup
 I, Frankenstein (2014) as Dr. Carl Avery
 Elvis (2022) as Senator Jim Eastland

TV series credits

 Skirts (1990) as Garry Block
 Ocean Girl (1994-1997) as Dr. Hellegren
 The Games (1998-2000) as Nicholas
 Stingers (1998-2001) as Detective Inspector Bill Hollister
 The Surgeon (2005) as Dr. Julian Sierson
 Tripping Over (2006)  as James
 Newstopia (2007-2008) as various characters
 Satisfaction (2007-2008) as Alexander
 Dirt Game (2009) as Nigel Hay
 Miss Fisher's Murder Mysteries (2012) as Murdoch Foyle
 Serangoon Road (2013) as Maxwell Black
 ANZAC Girls (2014) as General William Birdwood
 Winners and Losers (2015-2016) as Keith Maxwell
 The Ex-PM (2015-2017) as Sonny
 Wanted (2016-2017) as Ray Stanton

TV guest credits

 Mission Impossible "Command Performance" (1989) as Braun
 Neighbours multiple episodes (1991) as Martin Tyrell
 Lift Off (1992) as Mr. Bunyip
 Blue Heelers (1995-2003) as Frank Schumaker
 State Coroner (1997)  as Provis
 Good Guys Bad Guys (1997) as Dennis Dreeble
 Raw FM (1997-1998) as Neil Mulholland
 The Genie from Down Under 2 (1998) as Major Nigel Huntly
 MDA (2002) as Dr. Oliver Maudson
 Something in the Air (2002) as Michael Fox
 Kath & Kim(2003) as airline representative
 The Secret Life of Us (2005) as Marc Kinnell
 Holly's Heroes (2005) as Mr. Crawford
 Scooter: Secret Agent(2005) as Stepford
 Real Stories (2006) as Gordon Kearney
 Nightmares and Dreamscapes: From the Stories of Stephen King "The End of the Whole Mess" (2006), as World Health Officer
 Wicked Science "Meet the Parents" (2006), as Virgil Bailey
 The Librarians  "And Nothing but the Truth" (2007) as a barrister
 City Homicide  "The Promised Land" (2007) as Mark Silver
 All Saints 8 episodes (2007–2008), as Oliver Maroney
 Underbelly "Earning a Crust" (2008), as Colin
 Rush (2011) as Brett Cohen (two episodes)
 Tangle (2012) as Sean Roscoe (ongoing)
 The Bureau of Magical Things (2018) as Sean (ongoing)
 Frontline as Jonathan

UK TV credits
 Dixon of Dock Green (1962) as Billy
 My Father's House (1981) as Ray
 Strangers (1981) as Roger Wood
 The Agatha Christie Hour (1982) as Jeremy
 Inspector Morse (1987) as Dr. Swain
 Tickets for the Titanic (1988)

Theatre

Australia
 The Memory of Water, Melbourne Theatre Company, 2004
 The Dumb Show, Melbourne Theatre Company, 2006
 Festen, Melbourne Theatre Company, 2006
 Enlightenment, Melbourne Theatre Company, 2007
 The Winterling, Red Stitch Actors Theatre, 2008
 The Great, Sydney Theatre Company, 2008
 The Hypocrite, Melbourne Theatre Company, 2008
 Madagascar, Melbourne Theatre Company, 2010
 Richard III, Melbourne Theatre Company, 2010
 War Horse, Australian Theatrical Tour, 2013
 The Speechmaker, Melbourne Theatre Company, 2014
 Wet House, Red Stitch Theatre Company, 2015
 Dreamers, Fortyfive Downstairs, 2015
 North by Northwest, Melbourne Theatre Company, 2015

UK
 Breezeblock Park, York Theatre Royal Company, 1983
 Hamlet, York Theatre Royal Company, 1983
 Hamlet, Royal Shakespeare Company, 1985
 Richard III, Royal Shakespeare Company, 1985 and 1986 (touring Australia)
 Henry V, Royal Shakespeare Company, 1985
 Red Noses, Royal Shakespeare Company, 1985
 Loves Labours Lost, Royal Shakespeare Company, 1985

Audiobooks
Reader of Murder at the Nineteenth by J. M. Gregson, 2001
Reader of the part of Julian in Us by Richard Mason, 2005
Reader of In the Evil Day by Peter Temple, 2008
Reader of The Lieutenant by Kate Grenville, 2008
Reader of Hurry Up and Meditate by David Michie, 2008
Reader of John by Niall Williams, 2008
Reader of Jesus of Nazareth by Pope Benedict XVI, 2008
Reader of Walking Ollie by Stephen Foster, 2008
Reader of Buddhism for Busy People: Finding Happiness in an Uncertain World by David Michie, 2008
Reader of Along Came Dylan by Stephen Foster, 2008
Reader of The Leader's Way by the Dalai Lama and Laurens van den Muyzenberg, 2009
Reader of Barack Obama: The Movement for Change by Anthony Painter, 2009
Reader of Think! Before It's Too Late by Edward de Bono, 2010

References

External links

English expatriates in Australia
English male film actors
English male television actors
1958 births
Living people
Male actors from Huddersfield
Alumni of the Webber Douglas Academy of Dramatic Art
Royal Shakespeare Company members